Ajnala may refer to:

 Ajnala, India
 Ajnala Assembly Constituency
 Ajnala, Pakistan